The Bay Classic Series (currently running as the Lexus of Blackburn Bay Crits) is a road cycling race held annually in and around Port Phillip Bay in Victoria, Australia. The race consists of both a men's and a women's competition over three stages.

The men's stages are approximately one-hour criteriums (45 minutes plus 10 laps) with three sprints at 15-minute intervals. The women's stages are approximately 45-minute criteriums (30 minutes plus 10 laps) with two sprints at 15-minute intervals. Points are awarded to the first 10 riders at the finish (12, 10, 8 to 1). Additional points are awarded in the intermediate sprints to the first three places (3, 2 & 1 points) towards a separate sprint classification. A team classification is calculated from the points of the highest ranked three riders in each team of five.

Many world-class riders have previously ridden in the "Bay Classic Series", including Graeme Brown, Robbie McEwen, Mark Renshaw, Baden Cooke and Chris Sutton.

The event was founded by John Trevorrow in 1989 and is the current race director.

In 2022 the Bay crits will be running on the weekend of January 8-9 2022 at Eastern Gardens Geelong

Past winners

Race Cancellations
The Bay Classic Series has been running continuously since 1989, with some exceptions:

Past Results
 2020 Results
 2013 Results
 Men's Results
 Women's Results

References

External links 
 

Cycle racing in Australia
Sports competitions in Victoria (Australia)
Women's road bicycle races